Kostromskaya is a rural locality (a stanitsa) in Mostovsky District of Krasnodar Krai, Russia, located at the footsteps of the Caucasus Mountains on the Psefir River (Fars' tributary, Kuban basin),  southwest of the town of Labinsk.

With a population estimated in the hundreds, it is very agrarian and rural in nature and has many mulberry trees.  The roads in the village are mostly dirt or rocky.  The landscape is very mountainous.

The stanitsa is also home to the ancient Scythian kurgan or burial mound of the 7th century BC where a Scythian gold stag was found, next to the iron shield it decorated. It is one of the most famous pieces of Scythian art, and is now in the Hermitage Museum in St Petersberg.  Apart from the principal male body with his accoutrements, the burial included thirteen humans with no adornment above him, and around the edges of the burial twenty-two horses were buried in pairs. The kurgan was excavated by the Russian archaeologist N. I. Veselovski in 1897.

Notes

References
Hugh Honour and John Fleming, A World History of Art, 1st edn. 1982 (many later editions), Macmillan, London, page refs to 1984 Macmillan 1st edn. paperback.  
Piotrovsky, Boris, et al. "Excavations and Discoveries in Scythian Lands", in From the Lands of the Scythians: Ancient Treasures from the Museums of the U.S.S.R., 3000 B.C.–100 B.C. The Metropolitan Museum of Art Bulletin, v. 32, no. 5 (1974), available online as a series of PDFs (bottom of the page).

Rural localities in Krasnodar Krai
Iranian archaeological artifacts
Iranian archaeological sites
Scythian art
Kurgans